Andrew "Andy" C. Stone is an American computer programmer best known for his iOS app Twittelator, which to date has sold over a million units for the iPhone and the iPad. The founder, director, and principal programmer for Stone Design Corporation, Albuquerque, New Mexico. In his 25 plus year career as a programmer, he has published over 35 software titles for Hypercard, the NeXT workstation, Mac OS X, and for iOS iPhones and iPads. He retired from software development in 2015.

Hypercard 
Andrew Stone was a contributing author to the Waite Group's Tricks of the HyperTalk Masters 

Stone developed software for Sandia National Laboratories called ProtoTymer which allowed physical interfaces to be trial tested in a software version.

NeXT 
Fascinated by Steve Jobs’ vision for the personal computer, Stone was the first independent developer for the NeXT Computer to ship a shrink-wrap product, TextArt in October 1989. TextArt allowed designers to manipulate PostScript text with virtual knobs, dials and sliders. By 1990, TextArt had evolved into Create, a drawing program which shipped in 1991. At the same time, Stone Design developed a multimedia database manager called DataPhile.

Stone Design was a leader in electronic software distribution on NeXT and was a constant advertising presence on the first ever app store which was also invented using NeXT tools, The Electronic AppWrapper. According to an employee at the Paget Press (the startup responsible for the first app store) it was originally AppWrapper #3 that was first demonstrated to Steve Jobs and showcased Stone Design Apps. where applications like Create and DataPhile were selling along with 3D Reality and other Stone Design Apps. Stone Design Apps can still be found on the iOS App Store today, making Stone Design perhaps the longest running developer actively using electronic distribution via any app store service.

Besides Stone's notoriety in the NeXT World as the first independent software developer to ship shrinkwrap product for the NeXT Computer, were the legendary raves he and John Perry Barlow threw over 3 years, the first being held at the Exploratorium in October 1992. These parties are still being discussed today because of the mixing of LSD and the NSA together in the same space.

Stone's participation with the first government sanctioned Dimethyltryptamine research with Dr. Rick Strassman in Albuquerque in the early 1990s led to a collaboration in the underwriting of DMT: The Spirit Molecule: A Doctor's Revolutionary Research into the Biology of Near-Death and Mystical Experiences,  documenting the research. Andrew Stone was a featured DMT volunteer in the documentary film DMT - The Spirit Molecule. Andrew Stone serves on the board of the Cottonwood Research Foundation with Dr. Strassman, which provides scientific research into the nature of consciousness.

Between that time and Apple's purchase of the NeXT Corporation in December 1996, Stone Design developed a number of other products for the NeXT, including 3DReality, a 3D modeling and rendering package and CheckSum, a personal finance application.

Macintosh OS X 
When NeXT became part of Apple on December 20, 1996, Andrew Stone was asked to help introduce NeXTStep to Mac users and developers. He demoed Create in the keynote presentations at both MacWorld Boston and WWDC in 1997. He was a contributing editor for Mactech for several years 

Stone Design began to develop for the pre-OS X Macintosh, turning out a healthy number of products for a small independent company, including PhotoToWeb, a slideshow & photo application for the Web; SliceAndDice, a tool for making javascript navigation bars; PStill, a conversion utility for turning PostScript and EPS files into .PDF files; TimeEqualsMoney, a time/expense tracking and invoicing application; PackUpAndGo, a cross-platform archiving tool; and GIFfun for making animated .gif files. All of these applications were eventually bundled together as Stone Studio, but the company continued to develop software, 16 applications in all, which eventually found their way into a single package called Stone Works, which included all the titles above plus eight additional applications including: FontSight, GlobalWarmth, iMaginator, Stone Studio widget, PreferenceCommander, VideationNation, StarMores, and Xaos – Videator Enabled.

iPhone & iPad 
In 2008, Stone began to release apps for the iPhone. His first product, Twittelator, became one of the best selling apps for the micro-blogging service Twitter. Other products included , TalkingPics, Gesture, MobileMix, Soundbite, Pulsar, TweetTV and Intentionizer. He has contributed to other apps such as 140Characters, The Daily, Wine.com for iPad, WeGetIn, Trekaroo and Bandojo.

Personal life 
Since his retirement in 2015, Stone spends his time working on his organic farm, doing yoga, reading, hiking, and advocating for solar energy. He's married to internationally syndicated children's public radio producer Katie Stone, and has four children and four grandchildren. He has written an extensive number of articles on programming with the Cocoa code base. He also spearheaded a group called “the Cocoa Conspiracy,” a loose knit ad hoc professional organization for iOS app developers based in New Mexico.

Interviews with the Press
Erik Davis Interviews Andrew Stone on Expanding Mind
Mac Observer Interviews Andrew Stone
Wired UK Interviews Andrew Stone
Business Week article features Andrew Stone
Software Design Magazine Interviews Andrew Stone
arsTechnica Video + Transcript Interview with Andrew Stone
MacVoices audio Interview with Andrew Stone
TUAW Video Interview with Andrew Stone
AppCraver Interviews Andrew Stone
macNN reviews Videator

Notes

ZDNet acclaims Twittelator Neue
ABQ Journal 'Twitter Guru' Andrew Stone
Albuquerque Apps Developer Brings Programmers Together 
Wired Magazine Could Mac OS X be 'Holy Grail'? 
Complete 1991-1994 NeXTWORLD Magazines Archive

References

External links 

Cottonwood Research Foundation
DMT - The Spirit Molecule Movie

1956 births
Living people
American computer programmers